Ryan Bowersock, better known by his stage name Reanimator, is an alternative hip hop producer from Wisconsin operating out of Chicago, Illinois.

Career
Reanimator released the solo debut album, Music to Slit Wrists By, in 2004. He released The Ugly Truth, a collaborative album with the rapper Prolyphic, on Strange Famous Records in 2008. He has also produced tracks for the rapper Sage Francis.

Discography

Albums
 Music to Slit Wrists By (2004)
 The Ugly Truth (2008) with Prolyphic

Singles
 "Artist Goes Pop" (2008) with Prolyphic

Productions
 Sage Francis - "The Strange Famous Mullet Remover" from Personal Journals (2002)
 Sage Francis - "Hey Bobby (Reanimator Remix)" from "Slow Down Gandhi" (2004)
 Sage Francis - "The Buzz Kill" "Sun vs. Moon" "Lie Detector Test" "Slow Down Gandhi" from A Healthy Distrust (2005)
 Sage Francis - "The Buzz Kill (Reanimator Remix)" from Unsound (2006)
 Sage Francis - "Hoofprints in the Sand" from Human the Death Dance (2007)
 B. Dolan - "Still Electric" from The Failure (2008)
 Sleep - "Talk About It" "Who to Point the Finger At" from Hesitation Wounds (2009)
 Sage Francis - "Jaw of Steel" "Conspiracy to Riot" "Pump" from Sick of Wasting (2009)
 Curtis Plum - "Bike Cop" from Call My Cellphone (2010)
 B. Dolan - "Fifty Ways to Bleed Your Customer (Reanimator Remix)" (2010)

References

External links
 Reanimator on Strange Famous Records

Hip hop record producers
Living people
American hip hop record producers
Year of birth missing (living people)